A venture capital trust or VCT is a tax efficient UK closed-end collective investment scheme designed to provide venture capital for small expanding companies, and income (in the form of dividend distributions) and/or capital gains for investors. VCTs are a form of publicly traded private equity, comparable to investment trusts in the UK or business development companies in the United States. They were introduced by the Conservative government in the Finance Act 1995 to encourage investment into new UK businesses. 

The structure of a VCT is that of a public limited company on the London Stock Exchange. They invest in other companies which are usually not themselves listed, although VCTs can also invest in AIM companies, and some VCTs specialise in this area. VCTs tend to have a minority stake in the businesses they invest in, as opposed to private equity investing, where a majority stakeholder position is held.

Tax reliefs 
Tax reliefs are different for investors in new shares issued by VCTs and investors who purchase second-hand shares, for example on the stock market.

For second-hand shares, the reliefs are
 exemption from income tax on dividends on ordinary shares in VCTs
 exemption from capital gains tax on disposal of shares in VCTs

For new shares, the same reliefs are available, and in addition
 income tax relief at the rate of 30% on the amount subscribed for the shares (on or after 6 April 2006). This relief is available on investments up to £200,000 in a tax year (£100,000 before 6 April 2006), if they are held for at least 5 years (3 years for shares issued before 6 April 2006).
 for shares issued before 6 April 2004, capital gains tax deferral (that is, tax on the gains on the disposal of other assets within 12 months before or after the investment could be postponed until the VCT shares were disposed of).

Compared with the issue price of new shares in VCTs, the price of VCT shares on the stock market (second-hand shares) tends to be lower, reflecting the absence of income tax relief.

Criteria 
VCTs raise funds through issues of new shares. The managers of the VCT then have three years in which to invest this money. During this time they may hold the funds as cash or cash equivalents, or buy gilts, bonds and in some cases unit trusts / OEICs to attempt to maximize investor return.

Within three years of the share issue at least 80% of the VCT's assets must be invested in "qualifying" holdings. These are defined as holdings of shares or securities, including loans of at least five years duration, in unquoted companies and those whose shares are traded on the alternative investment market (AIM). These companies must have a permanent establishment in the UK and carry out a "qualifying trade". The balance of up to 20% can be invested into areas such as government securities, gilts or blue-chip shares.

VCTs may invest up to £5million in a qualifying company. Each individual investment cannot make up more than 15% of VCT assets. The gross assets of the company into which the VCT invests must not exceed £15million, and the company must have no more than 250 employees. If an investment is held in a company that becomes quoted on the London Stock Exchange then it can continue to be treated as a qualifying VCT investment for up to five years.

Types 
VCTs can usually be classified according to the following criteria:

 Generalist, Specialist or AIM: A generalist VCT invests primarily in unquoted companies from a diversity of industries; a specialist VCT focuses on a particular industry or sector such as healthcare or technology. An AIM VCT may also be generalist in nature but invests predominantly in AIM-listed companies.
 Evergreen or Limited Life: VCTs that are set up to invest indefinitely may be called evergreen. A limited-life VCT is set to be wound up after the minimum five-year holding period in order for the assets to be distributed among shareholders.

Amount of money raised by VCTs 
For the first nine years of their existence, Venture Capital Trusts raised an average of £181 million per tax year in aggregate. During this time, investors could claim 20% income tax relief on VCT subscriptions upfront, and also defer capital gains, thus avoiding capital gains tax.

In 2004 the amount of income tax relief was temporarily doubled to 40% by chancellor Gordon Brown, along with a doubling of the annual allowance to £200,000 per individual per tax year, while capital gains tax deferral was withdrawn. These changes helped VCT fundraising increase sharply to £505 million in 2004/05 and £779 million in 2005/06, the latter setting a record that would last 15 years.

After the level of income tax relief was reduced to 30% in April 2006, at which point the required minimum holding period was also increased to 5 years, the amounts raised by VCTs in the tax year did not exceed £500million for a decade.

In 2018/19, when £731 million was raised, the trust that raised the largest total was Octopus Titan VCT, which reached £227.7 million, a record for a VCT share offer.

In 2019/20, the amount invested in VCTs dropped to £619million during a year in which the UK left the European Union and the COVID-19 pandemic caused widespread interruption to business in the UK.

In 2020/21 £685million was raised, 11% higher than the previous year, although the overall capacity of VCT share offers was 7.5% lower, reflecting uncertainty over the economic impact of the Covid-19 pandemic.

In 2021/22 a new high of £1.13billion was raised, of which £170 million by AIM VCTs, also the highest on record. The year was notable for fast selling offers including Mobeus VCTs, which raised £35 million within a day of opening.

The amounts raised since income tax relief was set at 30 per cent are as follows:

See also
Business development company
Collective investment scheme
Enterprise investment scheme
Investment trust
Publicly traded private equity

References

External links 
 "AIC places Octopus VCT atop fundraising chart" Investment Week 2010-05-03
 "Tax breaks make venture capital trusts tempting" The Independent on Sunday 2010-09-26
 "How to save 30% on your tax bill without spending a penny" The Daily Telegraph 2019-02-28
 "Save tax and back small firms", MoneyWeek 2022-03-26

Investment funds
Private equity
Venture capital
Investment in the United Kingdom